Jaunpuri is a Northern Indo-Aryan dialect spoken in parts of the Garhwal region in the state of Uttarakhand, India. Its speakers are found in the Jaunpur development block in the east of Tehri Garhwal district. Although a separate identity for Jaunpuri has been claimed, it is most commonly considered to be a dialect of Garhwali.

Lexical similarity with neighbors
'''

References 

Northern Indo-Aryan languages
Languages of Uttarakhand
Tehri Garhwal district